This is a partial list of castles and fortresses in North Macedonia.

Arangel Fortress
Bansko Fortress 
Belica Fortress
Bučin Fortress
Budinarci Fortress
Creška Fortress 
Čučer Fortress  
Debar Fortress  
Debrešte Fortress
Demir Kapija Fortress  
Desovo Fortress  
Devič Fortress 
Dolna Lešnica Fortress 
Dolno Oreovo Fortress
Dramče Fortress
Drenovo Fortress
Evla Fortress  
Gabrovo Fortress 
Godivje Fortress
Gorna Banjica Fortress
Gradec Fortress  
Gradište Fortress  
Graište Fortress 
Ižište Fortress 
Jegunovce Fortress
Kalište Fortress  
Kanarevo Fortress 
Kičevo Fortress 
Konče Fortress
Konjuh Fortress 
Kosturino Fortress  
Kožle Fortress  
Krupište Fortress
Lešok Fortress
Lukovica Fortress 
Manastir Fortress 
Markova Sušica Fortress 
Matka Fortress  

Mlado Nagoričane Fortress 
Mordište Fortress  
Morodvis Fortress 
Opila Fortress  
Oraše Fortress 
Pesočani Fortress  
Podvis Fortress 
Marko's Towers
Radoviš Fortress  
Resava Fortress  
Rogle Fortress 
Samuil's Fortress
Kale Fortress
Sopot Fortress   
Šopur Fortress 
Srbinovo Fortress 
Stenče Fortress  
Stenje Fortress   
Štip Fortress   
Streževo Fortress
Strumica Fortress
Tetovo Fortress 
Treskavec Fortress
Valandovo Fortress
Varoš Fortress  
Veles Fortress  
Vinica Fortress  
Virče Fortress
Vodno Fortress
Zagrad Fortress
Zdunje Fortress  
Železnec Fortress  
Zgratčani Fortress 
Živojno Fortress
Zletovo Fortress  
Zovik Fortress 
Zrze Fortress
Zvegor Fortress

See also
List of castles
Fortress
History of North Macedonia

List
North Macedonia
Castles
North Macedonia
Castles